James Burchell Richardson (October 28, 1770April 28, 1836) was the 41st Governor of South Carolina from 1802 to 1804.

Born in Clarendon County to Brigadier General Richard Richardson (general), a famed Revolutionary War leader, and Dorcas Richardson, an American heroine, he received his education at the local schools in Clarendon County and afterwards engaged in planting at the Richardsons' Big Home Plantation. In 1792, Richardson was elected to the South Carolina House of Representatives and served for ten years. The General Assembly chose him to be Governor of South Carolina in 1802 for a two-year term. During his time as governor, the legislature repealed laws against the traffic of slaves, but prohibited the importation of slaves under the age of fifteen from other states.

Upon leaving the governorship in 1804, Richardson returned as a member of the state House of Representatives. He won election to the South Carolina Senate in 1806 and served until 1814. From 1816 to 1818, Richardson was a member of the state House of Representatives for a third and final time. He spent the rest of his life on his plantation where he died on April 28, 1836 and was interred at the Richardson Cemetery.

References

External links 
SCIway Biography of James Burchill Richardson
NGA Biography of James Burchill Richardson

1770 births
1836 deaths
Members of the South Carolina House of Representatives
Governors of South Carolina
University of South Carolina trustees
South Carolina state senators
South Carolina Democratic-Republicans
Democratic-Republican Party state governors of the United States